The Primetime Emmy Award for Outstanding Sound Editing for a Limited or Anthology Series, Movie or Special is an annual award presented as part of the Creative Arts Emmy Awards. Prior to 1976 and between 1979 and 1983, limited series and movies competed for Outstanding Achievement in Film Sound Editing.

In the following list, the first titles listed in gold are the winners; those not in gold are nominees, which are listed in alphabetical order. The years given are those in which the ceremonies took place:



Winners and nominations

1970s
Outstanding Achievement in Film Sound Editing for a Single Episode of a Regular or Limited Series

Outstanding Achievement in Film Sound Editing for a Special

1980s

1990s

2000s

2010s

2020s

Programs with multiple nominations

9 nominations
 American Horror Story

4 nominations
 Fargo
 Sherlock

2 nominations
 John Adams

Notes

References

Sound Editing for a Miniseries, Movie, or Special